Naseem uz Zafar is an Indian poet and the author of Ek Nukta Muskra Diya, a collection of Nauha, Musaddas and Salam and Nazeer e Karbala, the compilation of musaddas and salaam of Allama Maujiz Sambhali

Early life

He passed his higher secondary from Sukhdevi Inter College Hasanpur, Intermediate from Aggrawal Inter College  (Now Maharaja Agrasen Inter College), Moradabad, B.Sc From Kedar Nath Girdharilal Khatri PG College Moradabad, BUMMS from A.K Tibbia College, AMU Aligarh and M.D from Rajasthan University, Jaipur.

Work

His literary works include "Musawwir Sabzwari- Fun aur Shairi, Translation of Dr. Gurudas Das Gupta's drama from Bengali to Urdu as 'Naya Chand', Drama- "Mai Abhi Wahan Se Aa Raha HuN', Lyrics for Doordarshan's "Jung Abhi Jari Hai" and the compilation of "Nazir e Karbala" of late Maujiz Sambhali.

References

1952 births
Indian Shia Muslims
People from Amroha district
Lyric poets
Urdu-language poets from India
Living people